The 1983–84 Iraqi National Clubs First Division was the 10th season of the competition since its foundation in 1974. Al-Jaish won their first Premier League title and remained unbeaten throughout their 24 matches.

Name changes
Al-Shorta renamed to Qiwa Al-Amn Al-Dakhili.

League table

Results

Season statistics

Top scorers

Hat-tricks

References

External links
 Iraq Football Association

Iraqi Premier League seasons
1983–84 in Iraqi football
Iraq